Zlatno ( or ) is a village and municipality in the Poltár District in the Banská Bystrica Region of Slovakia. In 1998 it became a self-administered village, before it was a part of Kokava nad Rimavicou.

Glass production
Production of glass started in the village in 1833. Products had been transported to several world exhibitions. In the middle of 19th century came to Zlatno  Leo Valentin Pantoček. He invented the way how to produce the glass money. Later this technique was named as hyaloplastics. In 1856 followed the invention of iris glass. A lot of production had been exported to United Kingdom and United States. 
In Zlatno had been a glasswork museum, which, however, ceased to exist. The glass factory stopped its production in 2003. However, several private companies continue in glass production.

References

External links
 
 
Article about glass production history

Villages and municipalities in Poltár District